This is a list of grounds that Norfolk County Cricket Club have used since the formation of the club in 1876. The club has played minor counties cricket since 1895 and played List A cricket from 1965 to 2003, using 11 home grounds during that time. Before the club was formed, an informal county team had played some matches, including six matches between 1820 and 1836 which were later given first-class cricket status.

The county's first home minor counties fixture in 1895 was against Cambridgeshire at the County Ground, Lakenham in Norwich. Their first home List A match came 74 years later against Yorkshire in the 1969 Gillette Cup at the same venue. The County Ground played host to the majority of Norfolk's home matches during the 20th century, before the club moved to Manor Park, Horsford at the beginning of the 21st century. That ground has been used almost exclusively for Norfolk's home matches since then.

The 11 grounds that Norfolk have used for home matches in List A or Minor Counties matches since 1876 are listed below. The club has played other matches at grounds in the county. Before the establishment of the Minor Counties Championship in 1895, matches against other county sides were played at Lakenham, at New Ground in Norwich and at the Norfolk County Ground in East Dereham.

Grounds
Below is a list of grounds used by Norfolk County Cricket Club in List A and Minor Counties cricket matches. Grounds are listed in order of their first use by the county.

Notes

References

Norfolk County Cricket Club
Cricket grounds in Norfolk
Norfolk